Below is the list of populated places in Sivas Province, Turkey by the districts. In the following lists first place in each list is the administrative center of the district.

Sivas 

 Sivas
 Acıdere
 Acıpınar
 Ağılkaya
 Akçahan
 Akçainiş
 Akçamescit
 Akkoç
 Akkuzulu
 Akören
 Akpınar
 Alahacı
 Apa
 Armutlu
 Arpayazı
 Asarcık
 Aşağıyıldızlı
 Aydoğmuş
 Aylı
 Bademkaya
 Barcın
 Başıbüyük
 Başsöğüt
 Bedirli
 Beşpınar
 Beştepe
 Beypınarı
 Bingöl
 Bostancık
 Budaklı
 Çallı
 Çatalkaya
 Çaygören
 Çaypınar
 Çelebiler
 Çeltek
 Çerçideresi
 Çongar
 Damılı
 Damlacık
 Demiryazı
 Dikmencik
 Doğanca
 Dörteylül
 Durdulu
 Düzova
 Ebuhan
 Eğribucak
 Emirhan
 Eskiapardı
 Eskiboğazkesen
 Eskiköy
 Gazibey
 Gaziköy
 Gözeli
 Gözmen
 Güllüce
 Güllük
 Gündüzköy
 Günece
 Güneli
 Güney
 Günören
 Hacıali
 Hanlı
 Harmancık
 Hasbey
 Haydarlı
 Hayırbey
 Hayranlı
 Herekli
 Hıdırnalı
 Himmetfakı
 Yıldız Köyü
 Hocabey
 İlkindi
 İmaret

Akıncılar 

 Akıncılar
 Abdurrahman
 Aşağıyeniköy
 Avşar
 Balçık
 Ballıdere
 Çiçekli
 Derecik
 Doğantepe
 Dündar
 Ekenek
 Elibüyük
 Eskibağ
 Geyikpınar
 Göllüce
 İkizyurt

Altınyayla 

 Altınyayla
 Başyayla
 Bayındır
 Doğupınar
 Gümüşdiğin
 Güzeloğlan
 Harmandalı

Divriği 

 Divriği
 Adatepe
 Ağaçlıgöl
 Akbaba
 Akmeşe
 Akpelit
 Arıkbaşı
 Atmalıoğlu
 Avşarcık
 Bahçeli
 Bahtiyar
 Balova
 Başören
 Bayırlı
 Bayırüstü
 Beldibi
 Beyköy
 Çakırağa
 Çakırtarla
 Çakmakdüzü
 Çamlık
 Çamurlu
 Çayören
 Çayözü
 Çiğdemli
 Çitme
 Çobandurağı
 Çukuröz
 Demirdağ
 Derimli
 Dikmeçay
 Diktaş
 Dişbudak
 Dumluca
 Duruköy
 Eğrisu
 Ekinbaşı
 Erikli
 Eskibeyli
 Gedikbaşı
 Gezey
 Gökçebel
 Gökçeharman
 Gölören
 Göndüren
 Gözecik
 Gözecik
 Güllüce
 Günbahçe
 Güneş
 Güneyevler
 Güresin
 Gürpınar
 Güvenkaya
 Handere
 Höbek
 İkizbaşak
 Karasar

Doğanşar 

 Doğanşar
 Alanköy
 Alazlı
 Arslantaş
 Avcıçayı
 Başekin
 Beşağaç
 Boyalı
 Çalıcı
 Çatpınar
 Darıkol
 Ekinciler
 Eskiköy
 Göçüköy
 İçdere

Gemerek 

 Gemerek
 Akçaşar
 Baştepe
 Bulhasan
 Burhanköy
 Cesurlar
 Çatköy
 Çiçekoğlu
 Dendil
 Durgunsu
 Ekizce
 Eskiçubuk
 Eskiyurt
 Eşikli
 Hacıyusuf

Gölova 

 Gölova
 Akçataş
 Arslanca
 Aşağıtepecik
 Aydoğdu
 Boğazköy
 Bozat
 Canköy
 Çakırşeyh
 Çataklı
 Çevrecik
 Çobanlı
 Çukuryurt
 Demirkonak
 Dikköy
 Gözlüce
 Gözüküçük
 Günalan
 Güzören
 İlyasköy

Gürün 

 Gürün
 Ağaçlı
 Akdere
 Akpınar
 Ayvalı
 Bağlıçay
 Bahçeiçi
 Başören
 Beypınarı
 Bozhüyük
 Böğrüdelik
 Camiliyurt
 Çamlıca
 Çiçekyurt
 Davulhüyük
 Dayakpınar
 Deveçayırı
 Dürmepınar
 Erdoğan
 Eskibektaşlı
 Eskihamal
 Göbekören
 Gökçeyazı
 Güldede
 Güllübucak
 Güneş
 Hüyüklüyurt

Hafik 

 Acıpınar
 Adamlı
 Akkaya
 Aktaş
 Alanyurt
 Alçıören
 Alibeyli
 Aylıoğlu
 Bahçecik
 Bakımlı
 Bayıraltı
 Bayramtepe
 Benlikaya
 Besinli
 Beydili
 Beykonağı
 Celalli
 Çakmak
 Çaltılı
 Çınarlı
 Çimenyenice
 Çömlekli
 Çukurbelen
 Değirmenboğazı
 Değirmenseki
 Demirciköy
 Derince
 Dışkapı
 Durulmuş
 Düğer
 Dündar
 Düzyayla
 Ekingölü
 Emre
 Esenli
 Evci
 Eymir
 Gedikçayırı
 Gölcük
 Göydün
 Gülpınar
 Günyamaç
 Topçuyeniköy

İmranlı 

 İmranlı
 Akçakale
 Akkaya
 Aksu
 Alacahacı
 Altınca
 Ardıçalan
 Arık
 Aşağıboğaz
 Aşağıçulha
 Aşağışeyhli
 Atlıca
 Avşar
 Aydın
 Aydoğan
 Bağyazı
 Bahadun
 Bahtiyar
 Bardaklı
 Başlıca
 Becek
 Beğendik
 Boğanak
 Boğazören
 Borular
 Bulgurluk
 Celaldamı
 Cerit
 Çalıyurt
 Çandır
 Çukuryurt
 Dağyurdu
 Darıseki
 Delice
 Demirtaş
 Dereköy
 Doğançal
 Ekincik
 Erdemşah
 Eskidere
 Eskikapumahmut
 Eskikeşlik
 Gelenli
 Gelintarla
 Gökçebel
 Gökdere
 Görünmezkale
 Güven

Kangal 

 Kangal
 Akçakale
 Akçamağara
 Akçaşehir
 Akdere
 Akgedik
 Akgedik
 Akpınar
 Aktepe
 Armağan
 Arpalı
 Aşağıhüyük
 Avşarören
 Bahçeliyurt
 Bektaşköy
 Beyyurdu
 Boğaz
 Bozarmut
 Bulak
 Cevizköy
 Çağlıcaören
 Çaltepe
 Çamurlu
 Çatköy
 Çiftlikören
 Çipil
 Dağönü
 Davulbaz
 Dayılı
 Deligazili
 Deliktaş
 Delioğlanderesi
 Dereköy
 Dışlık
 Düzce
 Eğricek
 Elalibey
 Elkondu
 Etyemez
 Eymir
 Gebelikatran
 Gençali
 Güneypınar
 Gürükbekir
 Hamal
 Hamzabey
 Hatunçayırı
 Hüyüklüyurt
 Irmaç
 İğdeli
 İğdelidere
 İmamdamı

Koyulhisar 

 Koyulhisar
 Akseki
 Aksu
 Aydınlar
 Bahçeköy
 Ballıca
 Boyalı
 Bozkuş
 Çandır
 Çaylı
 Çiçeközü
 Çukuroba
 Değirmentaş
 Dilekli
 Ekinözü
 Gökdere
 Gölcük
 Gümüşlü
 Günışık
 Güzelyurt
 Hacıilyas
 İkizyaka

Suşehri 

 Suşehri
 Akçaağıl
 Akıncı
 Aksu
 Akşar
 Arpacı
 Arpayazı
 Aşağıakören
 Aşağısarıca
 Balkara
 Beydeğirmeni
 Bostancık
 Boyalıca
 Büyükgüzel
 Camili
 Cevizli
 Çakırlı
 Çamlıdere
 Çitlice
 Çokrak
 Elmaseki
 Erence
 Esenyaka
 Eskimeşe
 Eskişar
 Eskitoprak
 Gelengeç
 Gökçekaş
 Gökçekent
 Gözköy
 Güdeli
 Gümüştaş
 Güneyli
 Güngören
 Günlüce
 Hödücek

Şarkışla 

 Şarkışla
 Kaymak
 Abdallı
 Ahmetli
 Akçasu
 Alaçayır
 Alaman
 Alıkören
 Arıklar
 Bağlararası
 Bahçealan
 Baltalar
 Başağaç
 Başören
 Benlihasan
 Beyyurdu
 Bozkurt
 Burnukara
 Büyüktopaç
 Büyükyüreğil
 Canabdal
 Çamlıca
 Çanakçı
 Çatalyol
 Çekem
 Çiçekliyurt
 Demirboğa
 Demirköprü
 Dikili
 Dökmetaş
 Döllük
 Elmalı
 Fakılı
 Faraşderesi
 Gaziköy
 Gücük
 Gülören
 Gümüştepe
 Hardal
 Harunköy
 Hocabey
 Hüyükköy
 İğdecik
 İğdeliören
 İğecik
 İlyashacı

Ulaş 

 Ulaş
 Acıyurt
 Akkaya
 Aşağıada
 Başçayır
 Boğazdere
 Bostankaya
 Çavdar
 Çevirme
 Demircilik
 Ekincioğlu
 Eskikarahisar
 Ezentere
 Gümüşpınar
 Güneşli
 Gürpınar
 Hacımirza

Yıldızeli 

 Yıldızeli
 Akçakale
 Akçalı
 Akkoca
 Akören
 Akpınar
 Akpınarbeleni
 Alaca
 Altınoluk
 Arslandoğmuş
 Aşağıçakmak
 Aşağıekecik
 Avcıpınarı
 Bakırcıoğlu
 Banaz
 Başköy
 Bayat
 Bedel
 Belcik
 Buğdayören
 Büyükakören
 Cizözü
 Cumhuriyet
 Çağlayan
 Çırçır
 Çobansaray
 Çöte
 Çubuk
 Çukursaray
 Danaören
 Danişment
 Davulalan
 Delikkaya
 Demircilik
 Demiroluk
 Demirözü
 Dereköy
 Dikilitaş
 Direkli
 Doğanlı
 Emirler
 Erenler
 Esençay
 Eşmebaşı
 Fındıcak
 Geynik
 Gökçeli
 Gökkaya
 Halkaçayır
 Hamzaşeyh
 Ilıcaköy
 İğdecikler
 İğnebey

Zara 

 Zara
 Adamfakı
 Ağlıkçay
 Ahmethacı
 Akdede
 Akdeğirmen
 Akören
 Akyazı
 Alıçbel
 Alıçlıseki
 Alişanağılı
 Armutçayırı
 Aşağıçamözü
 Aşağıçamurcu
 Aşağıkovacık
 Aşağımescit
 Atalan
 Atgeçmez
 Atkıran
 Avşar
 Bağlama
 Baharşeyh
 Ballıklar
 Becekli
 Bedirören
 Bektaşköy
 Belentarla
 Beypınarı
 Bozkır
 Bulucan
 Burhaniye
 Büyükgüney
 Büyükkaya
 Büyükköy
 Canova
 Cemalköy
 Çatören
 Çaylı
 Çaylıca
 Çaypınar
 Çevirmehan
 Çorak
 Çulhaali
 Danışık
 Derbent
 Deredam
 Dereköy
 Dilekpınarı
 Dipsizgöl
 Düzceli
 Ekinli
 Emirhan
 Esenler
 Evrencik
 Eymir
 Girit
 Göhertaş
 Göktepe
 Gölbaşı
 Güllüali
 Gümüşçevre
 Ilıca
 İğdeli
 İğdir
 İkideğirmen

References 

Central Anatolia Region
Sivas
List